Idar Andersen (born 30 April 1999) is a Norwegian professional road racing cyclist, who currently rides for UCI ProTeam .

Major results

2017
 1st  Road race, National Junior Road Championships
 1st  Overall Course de la Paix Juniors
1st Stage 1
2019
 1st  Road race, National Under-23 Road Championships
2020
 1st Stage 1 (TTT) Giro della Friuli Venezia Giulia
 6th Hafjell GP
2021
 1st  Overall Tour de la Mirabelle
1st  Young rider classification
1st Prologue
 1st Lillehammer GP
 5th Overall Okolo Slovenska
1st  Young rider classification 
 9th Mercan'Tour Classic Alpes-Maritimes
2022
 1st Boucles de l'Aulne
 8th Overall Boucles de la Mayenne

References

External links

1999 births
Living people
Norwegian male cyclists
People from Melhus
Sportspeople from Trøndelag